John Spencer Letts (December 19, 1934 – November 10, 2014) was a United States district judge of the United States District Court for the Central District of California.

Education and career

John Spencer Letts was born in St. Louis, Missouri. Letts received a Bachelor of Arts degree from Yale University in 1956 and a Bachelor of Laws from Harvard Law School in 1960. He was a Reserve Captain in the United States Army from 1956 to 1965. He was in private practice in Houston, Texas from 1960 to 1966. He was a vice president and general counsel of Teledyne in Los Angeles, California from 1966 to 1973, and was in private practice in Los Angeles from 1973 to 1975 before returning to his previous positions with Teledyne from 1975 to 1978. He returned to private practice in Los Angeles from 1978 to 1985.

Federal judicial service

On November 7, 1985, Letts was nominated by President Ronald Reagan to a new seat on the United States District Court for the Central District of California created by 98 Stat. 333. He was confirmed by the United States Senate on December 16, 1985, and received his commission on December 17, 1985. He assumed senior status on December 19, 2000. He died on November 10, 2014, in Torrance, California.

References

Sources
 
 Central District of California Death Notice

1934 births
2014 deaths
People from St. Louis
Yale University alumni
Harvard Law School alumni
Businesspeople from California
Texas lawyers
Judges of the United States District Court for the Central District of California
United States district court judges appointed by Ronald Reagan
20th-century American judges
United States Army officers